The 2016 Copa Venezuela is the 47th edition of the competition. It began with the First Round on 28 June 2016, and concluded with the final on 19 October 2016. The winner will qualify for the 2017 Copa Sudamericana.

Venezuelan Primera División side Deportivo La Guaira were the defending champions after they beat Deportivo Lara 1–0 on aggregate in the previous final in October 2015, but they were eliminated by Universidad Central in the second round. Zulia won the competition after defeating Estudiantes de Caracas 2–0 on aggregate score in the final.

Round dates

Matches

First round
Teams entering this round: 8 teams from Venezuelan Primera División and 6 teams from Venezuelan Segunda División.
The first legs took place on 28 June 2016, while the second legs were played on 6 July 2016.

|-
!colspan=5|Oriental Group

|-
!colspan=5|Occidental Group

|}

Source: Soccerway

Second round
Teams entering this round: 12 teams from Venezuelan Primera División and 13 teams from Venezuelan Segunda División.
The first legs took place on 13 July 2016, while the second legs took place on 27 July 2016.

|-
!colspan=5|Oriental Group

|-
!colspan=5|Occidental Group

|}

Source: Soccerway

Round of 16
The first legs took place from 10 August 2016 to 28 August 2016, while the second legs took place from 24 August 2016 to 31 August 2016.

|-
!colspan=5|Oriental Group

|-
!colspan=5|Occidental Group

|}

Source: Soccerway

Quarterfinals
The first legs were played on 4 September 2016, while the second legs took place on 7 September 2016.

|-
!colspan=5|Oriental Group

|-
!colspan=5|Occidental Group

|}

Source: Soccerway

Semifinals
The first legs were played on 21 September 2016, with the second legs taking place on 5 October 2016.

|-
!colspan=5|Oriental Group

|-
!colspan=5|Occidental Group

|}

Source: Soccerway

Finals
The first leg was played on 12 October 2016, with the second leg taking place on 19 October 2016.

|}

Source: Soccerway

References

External links
Official website of the Venezuelan Football Federation 
Copa Venezuela 2016, Soccerway.com

Copa Venezuela
Venezuela
2016 in Venezuelan football